Atanas Lyaskov (born 9 July 1979) is a Bulgarian footballer, currently playing for Bansko 1951 as a midfielder.

External links
 

1979 births
Living people
Bulgarian footballers
First Professional Football League (Bulgaria) players
PFC Pirin Blagoevgrad players
PFC Pirin Gotse Delchev players
Association football midfielders
Sportspeople from Blagoevgrad